The 2012 CEV Moto3 season was the inaugural year in which Moto3 bikes became mandatory. Álex Márquez was proclaimed champion after finishing runner up in the 125cc class in 2011.

Calendar

Championship standings

Scoring system
Points are awarded to the top fifteen finishers. A rider has to finish the race to earn points.

External links

FIM CEV Moto3 Junior World Championship
CEV Moto3
CEV Moto3